Akiva or Akiba is a Jewish-ethnic name, arising in Aramaic from , and thus cognate to English Jacob.

Among Jews, "Ya'akov" and "Akiva" - though essentially variants of the same name - are treated as completely separate, arousing different historical and religious associations: the one recalls the Biblical Patriarch Jacob, the other relates to the Roman period Rabbi Akiva.

Akiva
 Rabbi Akiva (c. 50 – c. 135 AD), Judean religious leader
 Akiva Eger (1761–1837), central European religious leader
 Akiva Librecht (1876–1958), Israeli politician
 Akiva Govrin (1902–1980), Israeli politician
 Akiva Vroman (1912–1989), Israeli geologist
 Akiva Yaglom (1921–2007), Soviet & Russian scientist
 Akiva Ehrenfeld (1923–2012), president of Kiryat Mattersdorf, Jerusalem
 Akiva Orr (born 1931), Israeli writer & political
 Akiva Nof (born 1936), Israeli politician & songwriter
 Akiva Eldar (born 1945), Israeli journalist and author
 Akiva Goldsman (born 1962), American writer 
 Akiva Tatz (fl. c. 2000), a South African religious leader & writer
 Akiva Grunblatt (fl. 2000s), American religious leader 
 Akiva Schaffer (born 1977), American writer & comedian

Akiba

 Akiba ben Judah Loeb (18th century), German rabbi
 Akiba Lehren (1795–1876), Dutch banker
 Akiba Rubinstein (1882–1961), Polish-Jewish chess Grandmaster

Fictional characters 

 Akiva Shtisel, main character in the television series Shtisel
 Akiva, a seraph and main character on the American fantasy novel Daughter of Smoke and Bone

Jewish masculine given names